Dear Octopus is a 1943 British comedy film directed by Harold French and starring Margaret Lockwood, Michael Wilding and Celia Johnson. It is based on a 1938 play Dear Octopus written by Dodie Smith. It was also released as The Randolph Family.

Plot
Well-to-do couple Dora and Charles Randolph are celebrating their golden wedding, and three generations meet at the Randolph country home. As the relatives gather, each reveals his or her personal quirks and shortcomings. Caught in the middle is family secretary Penny Fenton (Margaret Lockwood), who has the unenviable task of sorting and smoothing out the family's deep-set hostilities and jealousies so that a good time can be had by all.

Cast
 Margaret Lockwood – Penny Randolph
 Michael Wilding – Nicholas Randolph
 Celia Johnson – Cynthia
 Roland Culver – Felix Martin
 Helen Haye – Dora Randolph
 Athene Seyler – Aunt Belle
 Jean Cadell – Vicar's wife
 Basil Radford – Kenneth
 Frederick Leister – Charles Randolph
 Nora Swinburne – Edna
 Antoinette Cellier – Hilda
 Madge Compton – Marjorie
 Kathleen Harrison – Mrs Glossop
 Ann Stephens – Scrap
 Derek Lansiaux – Bill
 Alistair Stewart – Joe
 Evelyn Hall – Gertrude
 Muriel George – Cook
 Annie Esmond – Nannie
 Irene Handl – Flora
 Arthur Denton – Mr Glossop
 Pamela Western – Deirdre
 Arty Ash – Burton
 Graham Moffatt – Fred the Chauffeur
 Henry Morrell – Vicar

Production
Lockwood made it after The Man in Grey in the spring of 1943. She wrote in her memoirs that "there had been some trouble over the script of this film. Neither Herbert [her agent] nor I had considered the part which was offered to me sufficiently good. After much arguing my part was built up, but even so I was not pleased with the film, and felt that for me it had been a backward step."

Harold French later said "I’d liked the play and thought I could make a picture of it and I think I did some of it well." He called it "a lovely film to make, very harmonious cast. I was delighted to get away from war films and make something light and frothy. It was just what the public wanted."

Critical reception
TV Guide described the film as a "routine English comedy of manners", but added, "it has its moments"; while Allmovie wrote "the film is variations on a single theme, albeit consistently amusing ones."

Box office
Kinematograph Weekly listed a series of films that were "runners up" in its survey of the most popular films in Britain in 1943: The Gentle Sex, The Lamp Still Burns, Dear Octopus and The Adventures of Tartu.

References

External links

Dear Octopus at TCMDB
Dear Octopus at Variety
Review of American release at Variety

1943 films
1940s English-language films
Films directed by Harold French
1943 comedy films
British films based on plays
British comedy films
British black-and-white films
Films based on works by Dodie Smith
Films with screenplays by Patrick Kirwan
1940s British films